The Region of Queens Municipality is a regional municipality in southwestern Nova Scotia, Canada. It is the northern gateway of the UNESCO Southwest Nova Biosphere Reserve, a centre of outdoor activities. Campgrounds at Kejimukujik National Park and National Historic Site, Thomas H. Raddall Provincial Park, and several other locations offer hiking, biking, canoeing, kayaking, cross-country skiing and snowshoeing. Its seacoast and inland areas are popular photo locations.

Geography
The municipality's boundary includes all of Queens County except for First Nations reserves.

Some of its communities are on the Atlantic Ocean's shoreline, while others are further inland; these differences can lead to localized weather patterns. Overall, the municipality's proximity to the ocean provides a temperate climate with mild winters, comfortable summers and a long autumn season.

History
The Region of Queens Municipality was formed in 1996 through an amalgamation of the town of Liverpool and the Municipality of the County of Queens. Its other communities include:

 Beach Meadows
 Brooklyn
 Caledonia
 Greenfield
 Middlefield
 Mill Village
 Milton
 Northfield
 Port Joli
 Port Medway
 Port Mouton
 Western Head

Demographics

Access routes
Highways and numbered routes that run through the municipality, including external routes that start or finish at the municipal boundary:

Highways

Trunk Routes

Collector Routes:

External Routes:
None

See also
 List of municipalities in Nova Scotia
 List of counties of Nova Scotia

References

External links
Region of Queens Municipality

 
Queens